Venice Theatre is a community theater in Venice, Florida, United States. Formerly Venice Little Theatre, the Venice Theatre is one of the largest community theaters in the United States.

History

The theatre operates at one of the former buildings of the Kentucky Military Institute. KMI closed its Venice campus in 1971 and Venice Theatre acquired the building on 140 West Tampa Avenue in 1973 for $78,000 and converting the building to a theatre required an additional $225,000.

On September 28th, 2022, the theater suffered extensive damage due to Hurricane Ian.

References

External links
 Venice Theatre official website

Theatres completed in 1950
Community theatre
Theatres in Florida
Tourist attractions in Sarasota County, Florida
1950 establishments in Florida